When Brendan Met Trudy is a 2000 film directed by Kieron J. Walsh and starring Peter McDonald and Flora Montgomery. It was written by Roddy Doyle. The screenplay concerns a Dublin schoolteacher who falls in love with a mysterious young woman who turns out to be a thief.

Plot
Brendan (Peter McDonald) is a shy, reserved teacher who takes his profession seriously.  Away from the classroom, he has a love of films and classical music. One night, after practising with his church choir, he meets Trudy (Flora Montgomery), a bright, witty and free-spirited woman whom he believes is a Montessori teacher. Despite the differences in their personalities, the two begin a relationship. Brendan is unaware that his new girlfriend is actually a burglar, and is shocked when Trudy asks him to prove his love by helping her on one of her 'jobs'. Brendan is torn between his feelings for Trudy, and the desire to do what is right. Throughout his relationship with her, Brendan slowly begins to discover himself, and realises that there is more to life than music and movies.

Cast
 Peter McDonald as Brendan  
 Flora Montgomery as Trudy
 Maynard Eziashi as Edgar
 Marie Mullen as Mother 
 Pauline McLynn as Nuala 
 Don Wycherley as Niall 
 Eileen Walsh as Siobhán
 Barry Cassin as Headmaster 
 Robert O'Neill as Dylan

Production 
According to producer Lynda Myles the film was "modestly budgeted" with Variety magazine estimating the production budget at $5 million.
The film received funding from BBC Films, followed by The Irish Film Board RTÉ, and Section 481 finance.

Peter McDonald, was cast as the lead following up on his impressive film debut as Brendan Gleeson's sidekick, Git, in I Went Down. Many actors were seen for the role but the producers were impressed by Flora Montgomery and cast her in her first cinema role.

The scene where Brendan and Trudy first meet was filmed in Kavanagh's bar in Stoneybatter.
The Ormonde cinema in Stillorgan, Co Dublin, was used for the scene where Brendan goes to see Once Upon a Time in the West, and the Savoy and the Ambassador on O'Connell Street served as cinema exteriors.

Reception 
The film received mixed reviews. Review aggregation website Rotten Tomatoes gives the film a score of 61% based on reviews from 62 critics. The site's  consensus was "The references to other films are rather overdone, and the direction is uneven".
Metacritic gives the film a score of 53% based on reviews from 25 critics.

Reviewing the film for the BBC, George Perry gives it 3/5 stars. Perry described the film as an agreeable comedy, full of in-jokes for film buffs, and plenty of non-film related delights too. He concludes "Under Kieron J Walsh's direction this is a sprightly 'odd couple' yarn brimming with sweet Irish charm."

Peter Bradshaw describes the film as "ordinary piece of work from Roddy Doyle" a standard rom-com, calling it "dull enough to qualify as an honorary British film".

Roger Ebert gave the film 3 out of 4 stars. Ebert says you will likely enjoy the film more if you get the film references but whether you do the film still works.
Emanuel Levy of Variety magazine called it an "intermittently funny movie anchored by strong performances" but he says the "writing and direction are uneven".

The film grossed £200,000 from 30 screens in its debut in Ireland.

References

External links 
 
  original trailer

2000 films
Films set in Dublin (city)
2000 black comedy films
2000 comedy films
Irish black comedy films
BBC Film films
Films shot in Dublin (city)
2000s English-language films